Reno is an unincorporated community in Leavenworth County, Kansas, United States. It is part of the Kansas City metropolitan area.

History
A post office was opened in Reno in 1864, and remained in operation until it was discontinued in 1918. The community was named for General Jesse L. Reno.

References

Further reading

External links
 Leavenworth County maps: Current, Historic, KDOT

Unincorporated communities in Leavenworth County, Kansas
Unincorporated communities in Kansas